Barney Bussey (born May 20, 1962) is a former American football safety.

Bussey was born  in Lincolnton, Georgia. He attended high school at Lincoln County High School in Lincolnton where he was a major reason behind Lincoln County's defensive success in the late 1970s. Bussey played both offense and defense. In 1979, he was named to the Class AA All-State team.

Bussey then attended South Carolina State University, where he became a Division I-AA All-American Defensive Back.

After college, Bussey was selected in the 1st round (8th overall) of the 1984 USFL Draft by the Memphis Showboats in January 1984.  Four months later he was selected in the 5th round (119th overall) in the 1984 NFL Draft.

Bussey then signed with the USFL Showboats on May 8, 1984 and spent two seasons with Memphis.  He was a key member of a defensive unit that featured future Hall of Fame DE Reggie White and led the club to the USFL Semi-Finals in 1985.

After the USFL folded in August 1986, he went on to play ten seasons with the Cincinnati Bengals and Tampa Bay Buccaneers in the National Football League, recording 10 interceptions and 6 fumble recoveries.

Bussey is a supervisor at a manufacturing company and a volunteer assistant coach at Lakota West High School in Cincinnati, Ohio, where he has been coaching since 2004.

American football safeties
Cincinnati Bengals players
Tampa Bay Buccaneers players
South Carolina State Bulldogs football players
Memphis Showboats players
1962 births
Living people
People from Lincolnton, Georgia
Players of American football from Georgia (U.S. state)